Edith Heard (born 1965)  is a British-French researcher in epigenetics and since January 2019 has been the Director General of the European Molecular Biology Laboratory (EMBL). She is also Professor at the Collège de France, holding the Chair of Epigenetics and Cellular Memory. From 2010 to 2018, Heard was the Director of the Genetics and Developmental Biology department at the Curie Institute (Paris), France. Heard is noted for her studies of X-chromosome-inactivation.

Education 
Heard graduated with a Bachelor of Arts degree in Natural Sciences (Genetics) from the University of Cambridge as a student of Emmanuel College, Cambridge, graduating in 1986. She was awarded a PhD from Imperial College London for research investigating gene amplification in rat cells in 1990 while working at the Imperial Cancer Research Fund Laboratory in London, UK.

Career and research 
Heard's main areas of research include genetics, epigenetics and developmental biology, in particular focussing on X-chromosome inactivation, which occurs when one of the two copies of the X chromosomes in female mammals is inactivated. Her work on this process started in the 1990’s during her post-doc in the laboratory of Philip Avner at the Pasteur Institute. After joining the CNRS, she continued to work on X inactivation, performing functional studies on the X-inactivation centre locus that regulates the initiation of X inactivation. In 2000, Heard spent a year as a visiting scientist in David Spector’s group at Cold Spring Harbor Laboratory where she discovered some of the early chromatin changes in the X-inactivation process.

Heard set up her own laboratory at the Institut Curie in 2001. Amongst her contributions, her group showed that X-chromosome inactivation happens not once, but twice, during development: first in all cells designated to building the placenta, then again in some cells sent off to build the embryo.

Heard developed powerful single-cell techniques enabling the analysis of fixed and living embryos and embryonic stem cells. These led to one of her major discoveries, showing that X-inactivation is a highly dynamic process during early embryogenesis and revealing major differences in X-inactivation strategies in different mammals, from mouse to man. Heard has also performed pioneering work revealing that in addition to epigenetic modifications, chromosome organization and nuclear compartmentalization are important players in the initiation and maintenance of X inactivation. Thanks to their studies on the X-inactivation centre, the Heard group also revealed the existence of Topologically Associating Domains (TADs) in collaboration with Job Dekker.

Heard has been a professor at the Collège de France, holding the Chair of Epigenetics and Cellular Memory, and from 2010 to 2018 she was director of the Genetics and Developmental Biology department at the Institut Curie in Paris. She and her laboratory moved to EMBL in 2019. In 2016, Heard was involved in establishing a Government of France programme to support scientists displaced by war or conflict – the Programme d'aide à l'accueil en urgence des scientifiques en exil (PAUSE).

In June 2017, Heard's appointment as the fifth Director General of the European Molecular Biology Laboratory was announced, and she took office in January 2019. She has served as a member of the science council of the  World Health Organization (WHO) since 2021.

Heard is a member of the Scientific Advisory Board of the French National Centre for Scientific Research, the Biotech Research & Innovation Centre (Copenhagen, Denmark), the Institute of Molecular Biology and Biotechnology (Crete, Greece) and the Francis Crick Institute.

Awards and honours 
In 2017, Heard was awarded the Inserm Grand Prix for her work on epigenetics. In 2013, she was elected a Fellow of the Royal Society (FRS) in recognition for her discoveries in epigenetics.  Her nomination reads: 

In 2011, Heard received the Grand Prix de la Fondation pour la Recherche Médicale. In 2009, she received the Prix Jean Hamburger. In 2005, Heard was a laureate of the FSER award. Heard has been an EMBO Member since 2005 and won the Suffrage Science award in 2012. She received the European Society for Human Genetics Award in 2017  and the Hansen Family Award in 2019.

In 2020, she was awarded the L'Oréal-UNESCO For Women in Science Awards and in April 2021 was appointed a member of the World Health Organization Science Council, and also elected as a foreign Member of the National Academy of Sciences. In 2021 she was elected to the German National Academy of Sciences Leopoldina. In October 2021, she was elected as an International Member of the National Academy of Medicine. In May 2022, she was appointed a Member of the Royal Danish Academy of Science and Letters. In July 2022, the Pontifical Academy of Sciences announced Heard's appointment as a member. In December 2022, Heard was  elected to the French Academy of Sciences under the section ‘Human Biology and Medical Sciences’ for her work on epigenetics, particularly in deciphering the process of X-chromosome inactivation.

Personal life 

Heard is married to French molecular biologist Vincent Colot. They have two children.

References

Living people
Epigenetics
British geneticists
British women geneticists
Members of the European Molecular Biology Organization
Members of Academia Europaea
Female Fellows of the Royal Society
Fellows of the Royal Society
1965 births
Alumni of Emmanuel College, Cambridge
Alumni of Imperial College London
British women biologists
Women molecular biologists
21st-century British women scientists
Members of the German Academy of Sciences Leopoldina
Members of the United States National Academy of Sciences